La Roche-sur-Foron (Arpitan: La Roche) is a commune in the Haute-Savoie department in the Auvergne-Rhône-Alpes region in Southeastern France. 

It is located about 23 km (14.2 mi) southeast of Geneva, Switzerland. In 2018, it had a population of 11,175. La Roche-sur-Foron station has rail connections to Lyon, Annecy, Saint-Gervais and Geneva.

Population

Noted local personality 

 Luigi Pelloux (1839–1924), Prime Minister of Italy

See also
Communes of the Haute-Savoie department

References

Communes of Haute-Savoie